Kesem is a national 501(c)(3) organization that supports children who are affected by a parent's cancer. It provides year-round programs and services to support these children, ages 6–18, at no cost to families. It has a presence at more than 130 college and university chapters in 44 states and the District of Columbia. Kesem is funded by donations from individuals, foundations, and corporations.

Activities
Kesem's flagship program, Camp Kesem, is a free week-long sleepaway summer camp for kids whose parents have or have had cancer. The camp is designed for kids to have fun and build connections with each other and counselors. Campers are grouped with peers their age. The campers transition through rotations that include traditional camp activities like arts and crafts, sports, or nature-themed activities. Campers also gather in their cabin for “Cabin Chat," where they can share about anything on their mind. On one specific day, the campers share their stories about their parent's cancer.

Throughout the year, Kesem also provides year-round services including care packages, personalized greetings, birthday cards, local gatherings, leadership groups, and affinity groups for campers and their families.

History
The first Camp Kesem chapter was founded at Stanford University in 2000 as a project of Hillel at Stanford, a nonprofit serving Jewish students at the University. The project was developed by founder Iris Rave Wedeking, and a group of student leaders who sought to create a summer camp experience for children in need for little to no cost for the families.

After assessing the needs of the community, the students found that children who have, or have had, a parent with cancer comprised an under-served population who could benefit from a summer camp experience with peers who faced similar challenges.

Camp Kesem at Stanford hosted its first summer session in June 2001, free of charge to 37 campers.

Iris Rave founded Camp Kesem National in August 2002 to share the project's model with college campuses across the nation.

Leadership

 Alicia Kabir Chief Executive Officer 
 Domonique Hollins Chief Brand Officer 
 Ingrid Reynoso Chief Financial Officer

National Teams
 Brand and Marketing Team
 Development Team 
 Finance, Admin, Systems and Talent Team 
 Operations Team

National Board of Directors
 Neha Biggs
 Elise Cornille
 Ben Cornwell
 David Cronin, Treasurer
 Sam Dorison
 Matt Hanley
 Dr. Brent Iverson, Secretary
 Jerry Katz
 Tonya Kinlow
 Heath Koch
 Dr. Eric McGary
 Betsy Morton
 Mark Luck Olson
 Robert Plotkowski
 Chris Berry Solomon
 Jay Stillwell, Chair
 Katie Vroman
 Iris Rave Wedeking, Founder
 Fred Williamson

Impact

For the fiscal year 2021, Kesem served nearly 7,000 children affected by a parent's cancer. More than 5,000 student leaders volunteered for Kesem.

 97 percent of parents surveyed believe that Kesem has had a positive impact on their family.
 After camp, parents report a marked increase in their child's self-esteem, confidence and network of support.
 99 percent of parents surveyed would recommend Camp Kesem to another family affected by cancer.
 97% of student leader volunteers surveyed are interested in continuing to do philanthropic work after college
 83% of student leader volunteers surveyed felt better prepared for life after college after their Kesem experience

Evaluations
[Charity Navigator] gave Kesem a  92.15, earning it a 4-Star rating, with the Finance category receiving 88.91 and Accountability & Transparency receiving a score of 100.00.

Kesem is a recipient of Guidestar's 2020 Platinum Seal of Transparency.

Collegiate Chapters

A - F
 Kesem at Arizona State University
 Kesem at Auburn University
 Kesem at Augustana College
 Kesem at Ball State University
 Kesem at Bellarmine University
 Kesem at Berkeley
 Kesem at Boise State
 Kesem at Boston University
 Kesem at Bradley University
 Kesem at Brown University
 Kesem at California Polytechnic State University, San Luis Obispo
 Kesem at California State University - Sacramento
 Kesem at Carnegie Mellon University
 Kesem at Case Western Reserve University
 Kesem at Central PA
 Kesem at Chapman University
 Kesem at Chestnut Hill
 Kesem at Christopher Newport University
 Kesem at The Claremont Colleges
 Kesem at Clemson
 Kesem at Colorado State University
 Kesem at Columbia University
 Kesem at Cornell University
 Kesem at Dartmouth College
 Kesem at Denison University
 Kesem at DePaul University
 Kesem at Dixie State University
 Kesem at Duke University
 Kesem at East Atlanta
 Kesem at Florida Gulf Coast University
 Kesem at Florida International University
 Kesem at Florida State University
 Kesem at Fresno State

G - L
 Kesem at George Mason University
 Kesem at George Washington University
 Kesem at the University of Georgia
 Kesem at Grand Valley State University
 Kesem at Hamline University
 Kesem at Harvard Undergraduate
 Kesem at Indiana State University
 Kesem at Indiana University
 Kesem at Iowa
 Kesem at James Madison University
 Kesem at Johns Hopkins University
 Kesem at Long Beach State
 Kesem at Louisiana State University
 Kesem at Loyola Marymount University

M - R
 Kesem at Marquette University
 Kesem at Massachusetts Institute of Technology (MIT)
 Kesem at Miami of Ohio
 Kesem at Michigan State University
 Kesem at Middle Tennessee State University
 Kesem at Mississippi State University
 Kesem at Montana State University
 Kesem at New Mexico State University
 Kesem at New York University
 Kesem at North Carolina State University
 Kesem at Northern Arizona University
 Kesem at Northern Illinois University
 Kesem at Northwestern University
 Kesem at Nova Southeastern University
 Kesem at The Ohio State University
 Kesem at Pepperdine University
 Kesem at Princeton University
 Kesem at Rice University
 Kesem at Rowan University

S - Y
 Kesem at Saint Louis University
 Kesem at San Diego State University
 Kesem at Santa Clara University
 Kesem at Seattle University
 Kesem at Southern Utah University
 Kesem at Stanford
 Kesem at Stony Brook University
 Kesem at Syracuse University
 Kesem at Temple University
 Kesem at Teton Valley
 Kesem at Texas A&M University
 Kesem at Towson University
 Kesem at Tufts University
 Kesem at University of Alabama
 Kesem at University of Arizona
 Kesem at University of Arkansas
 Kesem at University of California-Davis
 Kesem at University of California-Irvine
 Kesem at University of California-Los Angeles
 Kesem at University of California-San Diego
 Kesem at University of California-Santa Barbara
 Kesem at University of California-Santa Cruz
 Kesem at University of Chicago
 Kesem at University of Cincinnati
 Kesem at University of Colorado Boulder
 Kesem at University of Connecticut
 Kesem at University of Florida
 Kesem at University of Houston
 Kesem at University of Illinois
 Kesem at University of Kansas
 Kesem at University of Kentucky
 Kesem at University of Maine
 Kesem at University of Maryland
 Kesem at University of Miami
 Kesem at University of Michigan
 Kesem at University of Minnesota
 Kesem at University of Missouri
 Kesem at University of Nebraska
 Kesem at University of Nevada, Las Vegas
 Kesem at University of Nevada, Reno
 Kesem at University of North Carolina-Chapel Hill
 Kesem at University of North Carolina–Greensboro
 Kesem at University of Notre Dame
 Kesem at University of Oklahoma
 Kesem at University of Oregon
 Kesem at University of Pennsylvania
 Kesem at University of Pittsburgh
 Kesem at University of Richmond
 Kesem at University of Rhode Island
 Kesem at University of San Francisco
 Kesem at University of South Alabama
 Kesem at University of Southern California
 Kesem at University of South Florida
 Kesem at University of Texas–Austin
 Kesem at University of Texas–Dallas
 Kesem at University of Toledo
 Kesem at University of Utah
 Kesem at University of Vermont
 Kesem at University of Virginia
 Kesem at University of Washington
 Kesem at University of Wisconsin–Madison
 Kesem at Utah Valley
 Kesem at Vanderbilt University
 Kesem at Virginia Commonwealth University
 Kesem at Virginia Tech
 Kesem at Washington University in St. Louis
 Kesem at Western Carolina University
 Kesem at West Virginia University
 Kesem at Whitworth University
 Kesem at William & Mary
 Kesem at Yale University

References

External links
 Official organizational website
 The 'Magical Camp' for kids whose parents have cancer
 Camp Kesem might be 'Cancer Camp' but most kids want to come back for s'more
 Camp Kesem on the Today Show

Summer camps for children with special needs
Summer camps in the United States